Hume is an unincorporated community in Allen County, in the U.S. state of Ohio.

History
Hume had its start when the railroad was extended to that point. A post office called Hume was established in 1875, and remained in operation until 1960.

References

Unincorporated communities in Allen County, Ohio
1875 establishments in Ohio
Populated places established in 1875
Unincorporated communities in Ohio